Panago is a privately held Canadian pizza delivery and takeout chain with approximately 200 locations across six provinces. It was founded in 1986 by the Rooke Family. Panago is a franchise business with each location being franchisee-owned and operated. In 2015, Panago generated over 150 million dollars in sales.

History
The first three stores opened in 1986 in Abbotsford, British Columbia, and operated under the brand "Panagopoulos," which is the name the chain grew under, until it was rebranded as "Panago" in 2000. Panago has a strong presence in British Columbia, which has 96 locations followed by 68 locations in Alberta. Other stores in operation include eight in Saskatchewan, four in Manitoba, 22 in Ontario and one in Newfoundland.

The Panago head office is in Abbotsford and there is a regional office in Downtown Toronto. Current expansion efforts are heavily focused in the province of Ontario. The first urban Toronto location opened at Bay and Gerrard in April 2007. According to the company, further expansion is planned for the Greater Toronto Area.

Panago currently has two customer contact centres located in Abbotsford and New Westminster, servicing calls from all stores.

Menu
Panago offers over 30 different pizza recipes on the menu. Customers may order by recipe or create their own. The company offers regular, thin, multigrain, gluten-smart crusts, eight sauces, seven types of cheese and over thirty toppings. 

Panago also serves salads, cheesy bread, four types of wings, boneless chicken bites, Impossible nuggets, cinnamon breadsticks, New York cheesecake (although seasonal flavors of cheesecake are common), dips and soft drinks.

In 2008, Panago removed added MSG as well as artificial flavors and colors from all of its ingredients. This change met the approval of BC nutritionists as it allowed Panago's pizza to fit within the stricter guidelines for food in schools that were put forward by the BC government in September 2009. Partnered with a number of schools in the Vancouver region, Panago offers 18 different serving sizes for five pizza selections that meet the criteria and fall under the "Choose Most" category.

Similarly, these school offerings served in the most popular serving size of one-tenth or one-eighth of a large pizza, also meet the requirements for Ontario's "Sell Most" category. This category is outlined in the nutritional policy from the province of Ontario and includes nutritional standards for food and beverages sold in schools. The School Food and Beverage Policy was announced in January 2010, took effect on September 1, 2011. Leading up to the full implementation, schools were encouraged to consider implementing the policy as soon as possible.

Panago is a partner of the Vancouver Aquarium and offers only Ocean Wise certified seafood on the menu. Certification requires that all seafood is sourced from a sustainable fishery and harvested in an environmentally sound manner. By 2019, however, Panago had removed all seafood toppings from its menu.

As a special order, Panago offers a gluten-smart pizza crust, which is sold in medium sizing. Its menu also lists gluten-free toppings. It offers an extensive vegetarian and vegan menu, including dairy free cheese, a Beyond Meat "sausage" crumble and Gardein plant-based "chick'n" tenders.

Innovation
Launched in 2000, Panago is known by many customers for popularizing dips and shakers which are offered with the purchase of every pizza. In 2003, it launched the largest deployment of wireless debit-at-the-door machines in Canada, allowing customers to pay for their delivered pizzas without cash or cheque.

In 2008, Panago released a private label line of take-home products called Panago Cucina. This product line includes olives, balsamic vinegar, olive oil, pizza seasoning shakers, organic juice, and water. Panago has published online recipes that customers can use at home that incorporate ingredients from the product line. In 2008, Panago launched a reusable insulated pizza bag, designed to keep pizza hot for customers who pick up their pizza.

Customers may also choose dairy-free Daiya cheese as a topping, along with other vegan-friendly options.

Panago uses sustainable packaging, most of which may be recycled via municipal recycling programs, or composted. All pizza boxes and wing boxes are made with FSC certified materials, and all single-use cutlery is biodegradable plastics made from plant starch.

Awards and recognition
In May 2009, Panago was the recipient of 12 Frankie Awards presented by the Canadian Franchise Association. Gold awards were given for store design, brochures, packaging and a December 2008 promotion. Panago works with the advertising and design firm Mercer Creative.

In November 2010, an independent study, conducted by J. D. Power and Associates, found that Panago Pizza was ranked highest in the quick-service category in the Vancouver market. ("Quick service" was defined as places offering inexpensive food, ordered at a register or selected from a food bar and where meals are paid prior to being served to the customer.) The study included satisfaction rankings for restaurant chains using four factors that typically drive overall customer satisfaction. Listed in order of importance, these factors include price, service (including timeliness of order and wait staff courtesy and friendliness), meal (including quality/taste of food, meal presentation and portion size) and environment (including ambiance, cleanliness and convenience of location/hours).

Community involvement
Panago participates in community initiatives centered on amateur sport, children's literacy, volunteering and fundraising. Awards developed to recognize children for good sportsmanship and literacy are distributed by Panago locations. Each one is redeemable for a small pizza for children who earn them in the classroom or while playing sport. Panago also offers assistance with fundraising to amateur sport teams and not-for-profit organizations in addition to pizza donations in support of volunteering. Panago became an official sponsor of the Steve Dangle Podcast on 7 November 2013.

In fall 2015, Panago was involved in anti-bullying week and partnered with Bullying.org.

Panago is also a partner of Live Nation to include concert tickets in its contests.

Legal
In 2002, Panago Pizza was involved in an arbitration against a Delta, BC, resident, who had registered the domain panago.biz. The complaint requested transfer of the domain to the pizza chain but was dismissed.

See also

List of Canadian restaurant chains
List of Canadian pizza chains

References

External links
 Official website
 Franchise site

Companies based in Burnaby
Pizza chains of Canada